Dinah Washington Park is a park located at 8215 S. Euclid Avenue in the South Chicago community area of Chicago, Illinois, USA. It was named for singer and Chicago resident Dinah Washington.  It is one of four Chicago Park District parks named after persons surnamed Washington (the others being Washington Park, Harold Washington Park and Washington Square Park).  It is one of 40 Chicago Park District parks named after influential African Americans.

The Chicago Park District purchased the vacant lot in 1972 with the help of the U.S. Department of Housing and Urban Development.

External links
Chicago Park District Page

Notes

Dinah Washington Park
South Side, Chicago